Bruce "The Preacher" Macfie (born 6 July 1978) is an Australian middleweight kickboxer from Brisbane, Queensland. He is current Intercontinental and Commonwealth World Muay Thai Council (WMC) Muay Thai Middleweight champion. In 2007 he took part of the reality based television series The Contender Asia.

Biography and career

Bruce Macfie started training Muay Thai in 1995 at Street Heat Muay Thai gym in Noosa, Australia. While training and fighting out of the Street Heat Muay Thai Gym bruce Travelled with master trainer Glen "Pops" Triming father of Kristian Sting Triming and Jamie Peake also fighting out of the street heat gym to far north Queensland to Blackwater Rockhampton for the Mauy Thai Show "The Bar room Brawlers" show as a part of the Sunshine coast team versus the North Queensland team. Bruce knocked hi opponent out early in the second round with a knee to the face. On the return trip bruce talked of his love for god and his family history with his faith. Pops then gave Bruce his fighting name: Bruce "The Preacher" Macfie. and fought He is now one of the most experienced professional Muay Thai fighters in Australia. Preacher has fought many fighters such as John Wayne Parr, Yodsaenklai Fairtex, Saiyok Pumpanmuang, Soren Monkongtong, Daniel Dawson, Lamsongkram Chuwattana, and Warren Elson.

A regular feature on Fox Sports popular Muay Thai broadcasts, MacFie appears on Australia's largest Muay Thai broadcast fight cards including events such as Xplosion and Evolution. A three-time WMC Intercontinental champion, six-time Australian champion and current WMC interim world title holder, MacFie's fights have been broadcast around Australia and the world on such networks as: Fox Sports, AXN Asia, EuroSports, ESPN and ITV4 UK.

In addition to his television exposure, MacFie is a favourite of print media, having appeared in magazines and newspapers and on the cover of International Kickboxer Magazine the world's leading kickboxing and Muay Thai publication.

The Contender Asia
In 2007 Bruce Macfie was featured in The Contender Asia reality show alongside of other Australian fighters John Wayne Parr and Soren Monkongtong.

Titles
WKBF World Champion
WKA World Champion
WMC World champion (Interim)
6 Times WMC Australian Muay Thai champion
Current WMC Intercontinental Muay Thai champion
Current WMC Commonwealth Muay Thai champion
WMC South Pacific champion
Australian Pro ISKA Welterweight champion
2003 IFMA World Muay Thai Championships Silver medal 71 kg
2008 NO CONTEST Thai Boxing Challenge Champion

Fight record

See also
List of male kickboxers

References

External links

1978 births
Sportsmen from Queensland
Kickboxers from Brisbane
Australian male kickboxers
Middleweight kickboxers
Australian Muay Thai practitioners
Australian expatriate sportspeople in Thailand
Living people
The Contender (TV series) participants